Marsypophora is a genus of moths in the subfamily Arctiinae.

Species
 Marsypophora dissimilipennis Dognin, 1892
 Marsypophora erycinoides Felder, 1875

References

Natural History Museum Lepidoptera generic names catalog

Lithosiini